Liam Ryan (born 1 January 1978) is a former hurler with the Dublin senior team and O'Tooles GAC. Ryan retired from intercounty hurling prior to the commencement of the 2012 National hurling league.

References

Living people
1978 births
Dublin inter-county hurlers
O'Tooles hurlers